Bolivia competed at the 2022 World Games held in Birmingham, United States from 7 to 17 July, 2022. Athletes representing Bolivia won one bronze medal and the country finished in 70th place in the medal table.

Medalists

Competitors
The following is the list of number of competitors in the Games.

Racquetball

Bolivia won one bronze medal in racquetball.

References

Nations at the 2022 World Games
World Games
World Games